This article provides information on candidates who stood at the 2018 Tasmanian state election, which was held on 3 March 2018.

Retiring Members

Labor
Lara Giddings (Franklin) – announced retirement 14 May 2017
David Llewellyn (Lyons) – announced retirement 15 May 2017

Liberal
Matthew Groom (Denison) – announced retirement 23 September 2017

House of Assembly
Sitting members at the time of the election are shown in bold text. Tickets that elected at least one MHA are highlighted in the relevant colour. Successful candidates are indicated by an asterisk (*).

Bass
Five seats were up for election. The Labor Party was defending one seat. The Liberal Party was defending three seats. The Tasmanian Greens were defending one seat.

Braddon
Five seats were up for election. The Labor Party was defending one seat. The Liberal Party was defending four seats.

Denison
Five seats were up for election. The Labor Party was defending two seats. The Liberal Party was defending two seats. The Tasmanian Greens were defending one seat.

Franklin
Five seats were up for election. The Labor Party was defending one seat. The Liberal Party was defending three seats. The Tasmanian Greens were defending one seat.

Lyons
Five seats were up for election. The Labor Party was defending two seats. The Liberal Party was defending three seats.

See also
 Members of the Tasmanian House of Assembly, 2014–2018

References

Tasmanian Electoral Commission - Candidates

Candidates for Tasmanian state elections